Nyala Krullaars (born 25 September 2001) is a Dutch female handball player who plays for Danish club EH Aalborg in the Damehåndboldligaen.

She also represented Netherlands in the 2019 Women's U-19 European Handball Championship, were she received silver.

Achievements
Junior European Championship:
Silver Medalist: 2019

References

2001 births
Living people
Dutch female handball players
Dutch expatriate sportspeople in Denmark
21st-century Dutch women